Majare Karve is a small village/hamlet in Chandgad taluka in Kolhapur District of Maharashtra, India. It has own Panchayath with more than 1500 population. Situated on central point From Belguam and District office Chandgad on Belguam-Savantwadi highway. It belongs to Desh or Paschim Maharashtra region. It belongs to Pune Division.

It is located 103 km towards South from District headquarters Kolhapur. 24 km from Chandgad and 444 km from State capital Mumbai. It has Pin code is 416507 and postal head office is Karve.

Gaulwadi (2 km ), Humbarwadi ( 6 km), Dholagarwadi (4 km), Murkutewadi ( 1 km ), Turkewadi (4 km ) are the nearby villages to Karve (majare). Majare Karve is surrounded by Belgaum District towards the East, Ajara Taluka to the North, Gadhinglaj Taluka towards North, Khanapur Taluka towards South.

Belgaum, Sankeshwar, Nipani, Sawantwadi are the nearby cities to Majare Karve.

Demographics of Majare Karve 
Marathi is the Local Language.

Education

School and Colleges in Majare Karve
 Mahatma Fule High School Majare Karve
 M. B. Tupare Jr. College Majare Karve
 Kendriya Vidya Mandir Majare

Colleges near Majare Karve
 Y. C. College, Halkarni ( 4 km)
 Saraswati Junior College, Kalkundri (8 km)
 Shri Man V.P. Desai Jr College, Kowad (15 km)
 College Of Arts, Kowad
 ITI College Turkewadi, Patne phata(1 km)

Tourist Places Near By Majare Karve, Kolhapur
 Jagamahatti Dam
 Sundi Fall and Mahipalgadh Fort
 Swapnawel Point
 Amboli Falls
 Prataprav Gujjar Samadhi, Nesari
 Goa
 Sawantwadi
 Sindhudur

Awards -
 Nirmal Gram Award win in 2007.
 Swach Gram Award win on district level with first Rank 2005

Villages in Kolhapur district